Saksham Kulkarni is an Indian actor who works in Marathi television and films.

Filmography

 De Dhakka 2 (2022)
 Pak Pak Pakaak (2005)
 Shevri (2006)
 De Dhakka (2008)
 Lonavala Bypass (2009) 
 Shikshanachya Aaicha Gho (2010) 
 Allah Ke Banday (2010) 
 Fakt Ladh Mhana (2011)
 Kaksparsh (2012)
 Life Mein Hungama Hai (2013)
 Amhi Bolato (2014) 
 Ghantaa (2016)
 Laden Ala Re Ala (2017)
 Ziprya (2018)
 Bhai: Vyakti Ki Valli (2019)

Television 

 Ambat Goad (2012-2014) 
 Love Lagna Locha (2016-2018)
Padded Ki Pushup (2018)

References

External links
http://www.imdb.com/name/nm2727360/
http://entertainment.oneindia.in/celebs/saksham-kulkarni.html

Marathi actors
Indian male film actors
Male actors from Pune
Male actors in Marathi television